Nilgerides is a monotypic moth genus of the family Erebidae. Its only species, Nilgerides trifasciata, is known from Sumatra. Both the genus and the species were first described by Michael Fibiger in 2010.

The wingspan is about 10 mm. The head, patagia, tegulae, thorax, and ground colour of the forewing are blackish brown, while the basal, medial, and terminal areas of the wing are dark blackish brown. The subterminal area and the fringes are slightly lighter brown. The crosslines are generally indistinct. The antemedial and postmedial line are brown, suffused with black scales. The terminal line is marked by black interneural dots. The hindwing is light grey, without a discal spot. The underside of the forewing is grey, suffused with dark scales. The underside of the hindwing is light grey, without a discal spot.

References

Micronoctuini
Noctuoidea genera
Monotypic moth genera